Nestotus macleanii, also known as the Yukon goldenweed, is a species of plant in the genus Nestotus. It is endemic to the Yukon, Canada. According to NatureServe, it is vulnerable but not currently at risk.

References 

Endemic flora of Canada
Astereae